Yuhuan Power Station or  Huaneng Yuhuan Power Station is a large coal-fired power station in Zhejiang, China.

See also 

 List of coal power stations
 List of power stations in China

External links 

 Huaneng Yuhuan Power Station on Global Energy Monitor

References 

Coal-fired power stations in China